Shamshi Khel is a town and union council in Bannu District of Khyber-Pakhtunkhwa. It is located at 32°55'24N 70°44'46E and has an altitude of 287 metres (944 feet).

References

Union councils of Bannu District
Populated places in Bannu District